Dewan Bahasa dan Pustaka (Jawi: ديوان بهاس دان ڤوستاک), abbreviated DBP, is the government body responsible for coordinating the use of the Malay language and Malay-language literature in Malaysia.

History

DBP Malaysia was established as Balai Pustaka in Johor Bahru on 22 June 1956, It was placed under the purview of the then Malayan Ministry of Education.

During the Kongres Bahasa dan Persuratan Melayu III (The Third Malay Literary and Language Congress) which was held between 16 and 21 September 1956 in both Singapore and Johor Bahru, Balai Pustaka was renamed Dewan Bahasa dan Pustaka. Royal Prof Ungku Abdul Aziz Ungku Abdul Hamid was instrumental in setting up the institution.

In 1957, DBP moved from Johor Bahru to Kuala Lumpur. Through Ordinan Dewan Bahasa dan Pustaka 1959, DBP was granted a charter with its own Board of Governors. With the charter, DBP has the power to form policies regarding the Malay language, responsible to spread the language and is able to go into book publishing business.

On 31 January 1962, DBP moved to its own building at Jalan Lapangan Terbang Lama (now Jalan Dewan Bahasa). The building's architect was Lee Yoon Thim and the prominent mural was by Ismail Mustam. 

Later in 1977, it opened offices in Kota Kinabalu and Kuching, taking over the role of Borneo Literature Bureau (BLB) in Sarawak. Soon after that, DBP had all the books in Iban language and other Bornean languages buried. However, some books were found and rescued. It was later alleged that all the books were burnt. Initially, DBP officials insisted on publishing works in national language (Malay language) or other vernaculars. However, soon after that DBP stated that they cannot publish books in regional languages because this would be against its own policy and is not economically sound in a small market of readers. Regarding the allegation that books of BLB were burnt, former Sarawak state DBP deputy director said that old books were written off or given away when it was expired, no longer needed, or there were overstocks.

Three other offices were established in Bukit Mertajam (1999), Kota Bharu (1999) and Johor Bahru (2003). The institution celebrated its 50th anniversary in 2006.

DBP also produces many talented novelists. Most outstanding DBP novel writers are Miss Siti Habsah Abdullah, Mrs. Malardevi Margamuthu, and Mr.Syed Satahkatulah Bin Mohamed Kalik.

Dictionary and other publications
DBP publishes the Kamus Dewan, for many years the prestigious dictionary of the Malaysian national language. The dictionary is not only descriptive, but rather it is also prescriptive, as it represents the results of the efforts of DBP to adapt the Malay language to accommodate the challenges of technology and science. DBP's role in developing and regulating the language may be likened to that of similar government bodies in other countries, for example the Académie Française.

It also processes many books, mainly work books and novels.

References

External links 

 DBP Malaysia
 

1956 establishments in Malaya
Book publishing companies of Malaysia
Government agencies established in 1956
Language regulators
Malay language
Federal ministries, departments and agencies of Malaysia
Ministry of Education (Malaysia)